Joseph Romeric Lopy (born 15 March 1992) is a Senegalese professional footballer who plays as a defensive midfielder for French  club Nîmes.

Club career
Born in Ziguinchor, Lopy is a product of Diambars. He signed a trainee contract with Sochaux, and signed a professional contract with the Ligue 1 club in 2012. After five years with the Montbéliard side, his contract was not extended, and he signed with Boulogne of the Championnat National.

On 25 January 2023, Lopy joined Nîmes in Ligue 2 until the end of the 2022–23 season.

International career
Lopy made his Senegal national team debut on 9 October 2020 in a friendly against Morocco.

Honours
Senegal
Africa Cup of Nations: 2021

References

External links
 Joseph Romeric Lopy at foot-national.com
 
 

1992 births
People from Ziguinchor
Living people
Senegalese footballers
Senegal international footballers
Association football midfielders
Diambars FC players
FC Sochaux-Montbéliard players
US Boulogne players
Clermont Foot players
US Orléans players
Nîmes Olympique players
Ligue 1 players
Ligue 2 players
Championnat National players
Championnat National 3 players
2021 Africa Cup of Nations players
Africa Cup of Nations-winning players
Senegalese expatriate footballers
Expatriate footballers in France
Senegalese expatriate sportspeople in France